The meridian 73° west of Greenwich is a line of longitude that extends from the North Pole across the Arctic Ocean, North America, the Atlantic Ocean, the Caribbean Sea, South America, the Pacific Ocean, the Southern Ocean, and Antarctica to the South Pole.

The 73rd meridian west forms a great circle with the 107th meridian east.

From Pole to Pole
Starting at the North Pole and heading south to the South Pole, the 73rd meridian west passes through:

{| class="wikitable plainrowheaders"
! scope="col" width="120" | Co-ordinates
! scope="col" | Country, territory or sea
! scope="col" | Notes
|-
| style="background:#b0e0e6;" | 
! scope="row" style="background:#b0e0e6;" | Arctic Ocean
| style="background:#b0e0e6;" |
|-
| 
! scope="row" | 
| Nunavut – Ellesmere Island
|-
| style="background:#b0e0e6;" | 
! scope="row" style="background:#b0e0e6;" | Nares Strait
| style="background:#b0e0e6;" |
|-
| 
! scope="row" | 
| Cape Alexander
|-valign="top"
| style="background:#b0e0e6;" | 
! scope="row" style="background:#b0e0e6;" | Baffin Bay
| style="background:#b0e0e6;" | Passing just west of Hakluyt Island,  (at ) Passing through the Carey Islands,  (at )
|-
| 
! scope="row" | 
| Nunavut – Dexterity Island, Adams Island and Baffin Island
|-
| style="background:#b0e0e6;" | 
! scope="row" style="background:#b0e0e6;" | Foxe Basin
| style="background:#b0e0e6;" |
|-
| 
! scope="row" | 
| Nunavut – Baffin Island
|-
| style="background:#b0e0e6;" | 
! scope="row" style="background:#b0e0e6;" | Hudson Strait
| style="background:#b0e0e6;" |
|-
| 
! scope="row" | 
| Quebec – passing through the Archipelago of Saint-Pierre Lake
|-valign="top"
| 
! scope="row" | 
|-
| style="background:#b0e0e6;" | 
! scope="row" style="background:#b0e0e6;" | Long Island Sound
| style="background:#b0e0e6;" |
|-
| 
! scope="row" | 
| New York – Long Island
|-
| style="background:#b0e0e6;" | 
! scope="row" style="background:#b0e0e6;" | Atlantic Ocean
| style="background:#b0e0e6;" |
|-
| 
! scope="row" | 
| Island of Mayaguana
|-
| style="background:#b0e0e6;" | 
! scope="row" style="background:#b0e0e6;" | Atlantic Ocean
| style="background:#b0e0e6;" |
|-
| 
! scope="row" | 
| Island of Little Inagua
|-valign="top"
| style="background:#b0e0e6;" | 
! scope="row" style="background:#b0e0e6;" | Atlantic Ocean
| style="background:#b0e0e6;" | Passing just east of the island of Great Inagua,  (at ) Passing just west of the island of Tortuga,  (at )
|-
| 
! scope="row" | 
| Island of Hispaniola
|-
| style="background:#b0e0e6;" | 
! scope="row" style="background:#b0e0e6;" | Caribbean Sea
| style="background:#b0e0e6;" | Gulf of Gonâve
|-
| 
! scope="row" | 
| Gonâve Island
|-
| style="background:#b0e0e6;" | 
! scope="row" style="background:#b0e0e6;" | Caribbean Sea
| style="background:#b0e0e6;" | Gulf of Gonâve
|-
| 
! scope="row" | 
| Island of Hispaniola – Tiburon Peninsula
|-
| style="background:#b0e0e6;" | 
! scope="row" style="background:#b0e0e6;" | Caribbean Sea
| style="background:#b0e0e6;" |
|-
| 
! scope="row" | 
|
|-
| 
! scope="row" | 
|
|-
| 
! scope="row" | 
|
|-
| 
! scope="row" | 
|
|-valign="top"
| 
! scope="row" | 
| Amazonas Acre – from 
|-
| 
! scope="row" | 
|
|-
| 
! scope="row" | 
| Acre
|-
| 
! scope="row" | 
|
|-
| style="background:#b0e0e6;" | 
! scope="row" style="background:#b0e0e6;" | Pacific Ocean
| style="background:#b0e0e6;" |
|-
| 
! scope="row" |  
| Passing just east of Concepción
|-
| style="background:#b0e0e6;" | 
! scope="row" style="background:#b0e0e6;" | Gulf of Ancud
| style="background:#b0e0e6;" |
|-
| style="background:#b0e0e6;" | 
! scope="row" style="background:#b0e0e6;" | Gulf of Corcovado
| style="background:#b0e0e6;" |
|-
| 
! scope="row" | 
| Mainland, Magdalena Island, and the mainland again
|-
| 
! scope="row" | 
|
|-
| 
! scope="row" | 
| Mainland, Riesco Island and Santa Inés Island
|-
| style="background:#b0e0e6;" | 
! scope="row" style="background:#b0e0e6;" | Pacific Ocean
| style="background:#b0e0e6;" |
|-
| 
! scope="row" | 
| Noir Island
|-
| style="background:#b0e0e6;" | 
! scope="row" style="background:#b0e0e6;" | Pacific Ocean
| style="background:#b0e0e6;" |
|-
| style="background:#b0e0e6;" | 
! scope="row" style="background:#b0e0e6;" | Southern Ocean
| style="background:#b0e0e6;" |
|-valign="top"
| 
! scope="row" | Antarctica
|-
|}

See also
72nd meridian west
74th meridian west

w073 meridian west